McCay is a surname. Notable people with the surname include:

Bill McCay, American author of over seventy books
Clive McCay (1898–1967), biochemist, nutritionist, gerontologist, and professor of Animal Husbandry at Cornell University
Henry Kent McCay (1820–1886), United States federal judge
James Whiteside McCay KCMG, KBE, CB, VD (1864–1930), Australian general and politician
Norman McCay, fictional character from the DC Comics series Kingdom Come
Patrick McCay, Irish born Scottish-American painter who resides in the Boston area
Peggy McCay (born 1931), American actress, with a career spanning over fifty years in films, television and soap operas
Ryan McCay (born 1986), Scottish footballer
Winsor McCay (1867 (?)–1934), American cartoonist and animator

See also
Winsor McCay Award, given to individuals in recognition of lifetime or career contributions in animation